Jan Ernst Abraham Volschenk (20 August 1853 Riversdale - 22 January 1936 Riversdale), was a South African painter, noted for his majestic landscapes of the Langeberg Range in the Western Cape Province.

Born of Dutch parents on the farm Melkhoutskraal, Volschenk started painting when still a child and was largely self-taught. James Reitz, the Government Land Surveyor, saw some of his drawings and suggested that his brother Gysbert, a Riversdale lawyer, take an interest. He eventually joined the firm of Reitz & Versfeld as a bookkeeper. At 51 years of age he gave up his office job and devoted all his time to his oils and canvases. His home district around Riversdale and the Langeberg, was his inspiration and subject matter, and he became a master of the subtle colours and tones of the Karoo mountains.

Volschenk's keen powers of observation spilled over into natural history - he amassed a collection of more than 4 000 beetle specimens.

When 45 years old, Volschenk married another Riversdale resident, Helen Smalberger, and they produced a family of nine daughters. Of these, Vera, the eldest, followed in her father's footsteps and painted in the same genre.

Timeline
1879 Exhibits four works in Cape Town
1893 Accompanies the Reitz family to Europe and is inspired by the art galleries
1894 Joins the South African Drawing Club and exhibits with them
1899 Marries Helen Smalberger of Riversdale
1904 Gives up office work and devotes full attention to painting
1936 Suffers a stroke and dies in Riversdale

Public art collections
South African National Gallery, Cape Town
Johannesburg Art Gallery
Pretoria Art Museum
Durban Art Gallery
William Humphreys Gallery, Kimberley
AC White Gallery, Bloemfontein
Albany Museum, Grahamstown

References

1853 births
1936 deaths
Afrikaner people
South African people of Dutch descent
19th-century South African painters
South African male painters
19th-century male artists
20th-century South African painters
20th-century male artists